Snowball bush is a common name for several ornamental plants which produce large clusters of white flowers and may refer to:

Species of Hydrangea, which tend to flower in the summer:
 Hydrangea arborescens
 Hydrangea paniculata
Species of Viburnum, which tend to flower in the spring:
 Viburnum macrocephalum (Chinese snowball bush)
 Viburnum opulus  (European snowball bush)
 Viburnum plicatum (Japanese snowball bush)